Saeed Mohammad Al Ghandi (Said Mohammed Said Al Kendi) is Emirati businessman and the former speaker of the UAE Federal National Council,  and was appointed to the position in 2003. He is the founder of Al Ghandi Group.

He served as the speaker from 2003 to 2005.

References

Year of birth missing (living people)
Living people
Speakers of the Federal National Council
People from Dubai
Emirati businesspeople